Goryeo ware (also known as Goryeo cheong-ja) refers to all types of Korean pottery and porcelain produced during the Goryeo dynasty, from 918 to 1392, but most often refers to celadon (greenware).

Celadon techniques were first introduced from China; Goryeo potters established a native style by the 12th century. One of these native styles is characterized by the  technique, a way of inlaying that was unique to Goryeo celadon. The color of the celadon, called  for 'green', was also highly admired. The industry arose and declined as the Goryeo dynasty developed. Many wares were produced at the Gangjin Kiln Sites in southwestern Korea.

An artist of the post-war era who specialised in Goryeo ware was Living National Treasure Yu Geun-Hyeong. His work was documented in the short film Koryo Celadon in 1979. Many celadon pieces from Goryeo are listed as National Treasures of South Korea.

Goryeo celadon

History

Early celadon 
 
Pottery and celadon had been introduced into the Korean peninsula in the Three Kingdom age. Demand for higher quality porcelain increased as the Goryeo Dynasty emerged. Along with the development of tea culture and Buddhism, wares based on traditional and southern China (Song dynasty) porcelain began production in Goryeo .
Most of the pottery made in this era are the kinds that are called haemurigup celadon and green celadon (low-grade)

11th century 
As the celadon techniques of the Song dynasty reached its pinnacle, much effort was made inside Goryeo to reproduce the turquoise coloring of these Chinese porcelain. A lot of kilns were made throughout the kingdom, leading to a variety of celadon being made. High grade celadon were made in order of the capital, and low grade celadon were made by the requests of temples, offices and local families of provinces.

Though Chinese influences were still existent, Goryeo styled shapes and decorations emerged in some porcelains. These are characterized by the utilization of light curves and a serene, elegant feel. Decoration techniques such as relief carving, intaglio carving, iron oxide glaze, openwork became in use. The sanggam inlaying also started at this age.

12th century 

The 12th century is considered as a zenith of Goryeo celadon, especially in its special color and harmony. The pure celadon made in this age had thin glaze coating that exquisitely reflected the jade color, called . They also had a great level of structural balance and elegance. There are records describing celadon of this age as world best.

Jinsa "underglaze red", a technique using copper oxide pigment to create copper-red designs, was developed in Korea during the 12th century, and later inspired the "underglaze red" ceramics of the Yuan dynasty.

Post-12th century 
Maturation of the aristocrat society due to events such as the coup of military officers leads to an increasing favor for extravagantly decorated porcelain. Inlaying techniques reach its height and opens a second zenith of Goryeo celadon. Other types of porcelain develop as whitening, iron oxide glaze, copper oxide glaze came in use. With the decrease of Chinese influence, Goryeo celadon acquires a more native shape, in unique patterns and decorative shapes. Thin, transparent glaze used to show the inlaid designs led to development of a crackling cooling pattern, called bingyeol (craquelure).

13th century 
After the Mongolian invasion in 1220, social and economic confusion had caused the general quality of Goryeo celadon to decline. Influence of Yuan dynasty is seen throughout the porcelain produced in this time. Though the celadon industry remained, overall density of expressions and smoothness decreased and the color and harmony are also diminished. This decrease in its beauty continues as the Goryeo dynasty recedes.

14th century 
In the late 14th Century, the Kilns of Gangjin and Buanyo were attacked by Japanese pirates and closed. Inland kilns replace them, putting an end to the age of celadon.  Though new characteristic shapes and designs appear, they are utilitarian instead of being elegant and restrained, as Goryeo celadon in its zenith did. One of these new types of porcelain is called buncheong.

20th century 
A revival of Goryeo celadon pottery began in the early 20th century. Playing a leading role in its revival in South Korea was Yu Geun-Hyeong, a Living National Treasure whose work was documented in the 1979 short film, Koryo Celadon. North Korean potter U chi-son separately recreated Goryeo celadon pottery.

Characteristics

Inlay technique 
For the inlay technique, several patterns are engraved on the surface of metal, clay, wood, etc. Other materials such as gold, silver, jewelry, bone are inserted in the same shape. This traditional decoration technique started to be applied in porcelain in the Goryeo dynasty. Purple (black) and white clay were used to show the patterns.

A pattern is engraved on celadon with a knife and covered with purple and white soil. When the soil dries, the overflowing mud is wiped off, remaining only in the carved areas; thus, a white or purple pattern will appear. When it is baked after painted with glaze, the white soil appears as white and the purple as black, and this pattern is seen through the glaze.

Differences from Chinese celadon 

Glaze of Goryeo celadon had a definite composition starting from the 11th century to the 15th century. It contained a lot of calcium in composition, with 0.5% of manganese oxide, which was more concentrated than glaze used in Chinese celadon. Also in the case of Chinese ceramics, there is enough time for nucleation-crystal growth, so it takes jade color. But the kilns in Goryeo were smaller than that in China, so the firing and cooling process took place quickly. Therefore, minerals in soil such as anorthite or wollastonite have no time for nucleation-crystal growth. This results in the color of celadon being closer to the gray side. In Goryeo celadon, quartz, black particles, bubbles, cracks can be observed too.

The technical contribution of the celadon is that it has a white, black, or gray inlay to emphasize the grayish green color. In addition, when they used white inlay, the glaze was intentionally composited to make cracks. Light was scattered by the small cracks. So degrees of color of the celadon depend on the location of view. Pattern such as of the Koryeo celadon

Types and decorations 

 Pure celadon is celadon which has no decorations such as inlaid lights on it. It is known as the first type of celadon ever made in Korean Peninsula.  Having no decorations, the shape of the bowl and the color of the glaze of this type of celadon are particularly excellent. It is considered to be the earliest celadon.
 Celadon In relief refers to celadon made using embossing technique. There are two kinds of embossed celadon. The first is celadon which must be embossed to show its shape, and the other is celadon with embossing used for decorative purposes.
 Incised Celadon is  made by engraving technique, which shows patterns that enter the surface of the bowl. The engraved pattern in celadon is very thin, so if the glaze is not properly melted, the indented lines would not appear, which makes incised celadon require very high skill. It is seen in the excellent works of the early celadon.
 Openwork celadon
 Inlaid Celadon  was made until the end of the Goryeo Dynasty. Many black and white patterns were embroidered. By using the method of digging the pattern with a sharp knife and then filling it with other colored clay, it is possible to express the pattern finely and to make the surface smoother. Cracks may appear because two different clays shrink together.
 Willow and Waterfowl Design is used in many kinds of ceramics including celadon, and it reflects the feelings of the ancients very well. The characteristic of this design is that it contains a beautiful rural landscape, arranging black and white harmoniously.
 Cloud and Crane Design was mainly used in prunus vases. This pattern of the sky expresses clouds and cranes that fly away from humans. It is not clear why people of Goryeo liked to use these designs.
 Flower design is usually a pattern of camomile, and it can be added by a pair of chrysanthemums
 Underglazed Celadon : The patterns of underglazed celadon are drawn with white & black paint on the surface of the bowl. The celadon is then painted with glaze and fired in a kiln.
 Paste-on-paste Celadon uses clay on brushes to draw dots or pictures before applying glaze. It is similar to inlaid celadon, but the patterns are not smooth.
 Copperized Celadon is red due to oxidation of copper. It is very rare and not numerous, because copper oxide is very unstable depending on the baking conditions such as temperature control and fuel supply, so it is very difficult to produce red color.
 Celadon in Underglaze Iron is created by applying wire paints to the entire surface of pottery made by celadon clay. The finished work is shiny with black and green colors.
 Gold  decorated Celadon is made by the technique of painting a part of finished inlaid celadon with gold. Melted gold is painted in the pattern of the inlaid celadon which has been glazed and baked to the second fire. It is then baked again in low fire to let the gold settle.
 Marbled Celadon is made by kneading grey celadon foundation clay with clays of other composition, the gray, black, and white color result in a marble pattern. No engraved patterns are found in marbled celadon.

Gallery

See also 
Korean pottery and porcelain
Buncheong
Joseon white porcelain

References

External links 

 Koryô Celadon at the Metropolitan Museum of Art online
 Koryo Celadon (Korean Ceramics) on YouTube

Culture in Goryeo
Korean pottery
Porcelain